Adam Joseph Scherr (born September 6, 1983) is an American professional wrestler and former strongman. He is currently signed to WWE, where he performs on the SmackDown brand under the ring name Braun Strowman.

In WWE, he is a one-time Universal Champion, one-time Intercontinental Champion, and two-time Raw Tag Team Champion (with Nicholas and Seth Rollins, respectively). He is also the winner of the 2018 Men's Money in the Bank contract, the winner of the titular match at the Greatest Royal Rumble event, and the winner of the 2019 André the Giant Memorial Battle Royal (making him the only wrestler to win both a Rumble and an André Battle Royal).

Strowman headlined many pay-per-view events for WWE. He is tied with Shayna Baszler for the most eliminations in a single Elimination Chamber match with five, tied with Brock Lesnar for the most eliminations in a single Royal Rumble match with 13, holds the record for most eliminations in a single André Battle Royal with 14, and he is tied for the most eliminations in a single Survivor Series elimination match with four. Upon debuting on the main roster in 2015, Strowman was associated with the villainous stable, The Wyatt Family, wearing a black sheep mask and being physically dominant. Throughout his appearances with WWE, Strowman was portrayed as an unstoppable monster, earning the moniker "The Monster Among Men," as well as "The Monster of all Monsters" upon his return in 2022.

Early life 
Adam Scherr was born on September 6, 1983, in Sherrills Ford, North Carolina, near Charlotte, to Sara and Rick "Crusher" Scherr. His father is widely regarded as one of the greatest slow-pitch softball players of all time, and is a USSSA Hall of Fame member who still holds the All Time World Series records in home runs (101), hits (166), and RBI (202). Scherr has a younger sister named Hannah. As he grew older, he spent time in Arkansas and Tennessee. As a young boy, he attended Bandys High School, where he was on the football, track and field, and wrestling teams. He went through a significant growth spurt in high school; he was 5 ft 8 in (1.73 m) during his freshman year and grew to 6 ft 5 in (1.96 m) by the time he graduated. After graduating in 2001, he "goofed off" until 2003, when he enrolled in a community college. He spent the next four years playing football semi-professionally for the Hickory Hornets, supplementing his income by working as a doorman and mechanic. Scherr attended the NFL Scouting Combine in 2007, but he ultimately did not turn professional. In the late 2000s, he began competing in amateur strongman competitions.

Strongman career 

Scherr earned his Strongman Corporation (ASC) Professional Card by winning the NAS Amateur National Championships on November 5, 2011. He won the 2012 Arnold Amateur Strongman Championships on March 4, which took place during the Arnold Sports Festival alongside the 2012 Arnold Strongman Classic. This victory earned Scherr an invite to the 2013 Arnold Strongman Classic. He competed in the SCL North American Championships on July 8, 2012, finishing in 5th place overall as well as competing in the Giants Live Poland event on July 21, finishing in 7th place overall.

Professional wrestling career

WWE

Training (2013–2015) 
Scherr signed a contract with the professional wrestling promotion WWE in early 2013 and was assigned to the WWE Performance Center in Orlando, Florida, where he adopted the ring name Braun Stowman (with the first name a reference to Milwaukee Brewers left fielder Ryan Braun). In 2014, he made appearances as one of Adam Rose's "Rosebuds" in his Exotic Express gimmick. He made his professional wrestling debut at an NXT live event in Jacksonville, Florida on December 19, 2014, defeating Chad Gable. On June 2, 2015, Strowman appeared at a Main Event taping in a dark match, where he defeated an unidentified wrestler.

The Wyatt Family (2015–2016) 

On the August 24 episode of Raw, Scherr, under the tweaked ring name Braun Strowman, made his main roster debut by attacking Dean Ambrose and Roman Reigns and establishing himself as the newest member of The Wyatt Family alongside Bray Wyatt, Luke Harper and Erick Rowan. Strowman had his first televised singles match on the August 31 episode of Raw, defeating Ambrose by disqualification. Strowman wrestled in his first WWE pay-per-view event match on September 20 at Night of Champions, where The Wyatt Family defeated Ambrose, Reigns and Chris Jericho in a six-man tag team match after Jericho passed out to Strowman's lifting arm triangle choke. On December 13 at TLC: Tables, Ladders & Chairs, The Wyatt Family defeated The ECW Originals (Bubba Ray Dudley and D-Von Dudley (collectively known as The Dudley Boyz), Rhyno and Tommy Dreamer) in an eight-man tag team elimination tables match.

On January 24, 2016, Strowman appeared at the Royal Rumble and scored among the most eliminations in the Royal Rumble match for the WWE World Heavyweight Championship, eliminating five opponents before being eliminated by Brock Lesnar, only to return to the match and help his fellow Wyatt Family members eliminate Lesnar. At Fastlane on February 21, The Wyatt Family lost to Big Show, Kane and Ryback, but got their win back in a rematch the next night on Raw. On April 3 at WrestleMania 32, he appeared during The Rock and John Cena's confrontation with The Wyatt Family. The Wyatt Family were originally scheduled to face The League of Nations on May 1 at Payback, but the match was canceled after Wyatt suffered a legitimate injury. The Wyatt Family soon began a feud with the WWE Tag Team Champions The New Day, defeating them in a six-man tag team match on July 24 at Battleground.

Singles competition (2016–2018) 

As part of the 2016 WWE draft, Strowman was drafted to the Raw brand while Wyatt and Rowan were drafted to SmackDown instead, separating himself from The Wyatt Family and beginning his singles career. Over the following weeks on Raw, Strowman modified his appearance and defeated James Ellsworth and several other local wrestlers who put up no challenge. On the September 5 episode of Raw, Sin Cara challenged Strowman due to him disrespecting luchadores; Strowman defeated Sin Cara by countout and by pinfall in the following weeks. On the October 17 episode of Raw, Strowman was confronted by Sami Zayn after easily defeating three local competitors in a one-on-three handicap match. Strowman was scheduled to compete against Zayn the following week on Raw, but the match never started as both men attacked each other before the bell rang. On the October 31 episode of Raw, Strowman won a battle royal by last eliminating Zayn for a spot on Team Raw for the traditional Survivor Series five-on-five elimination match. At the event on November 20, Strowman eliminated Dean Ambrose, but was the first man to be eliminated from Team Raw after being counted out due to interference by James Ellsworth, who was put through a table after being chased up the entrance ramp by Strowman. Team Raw lost the match. On the December 12 episode of Raw, Raw general manager Mick Foley announced a match between Strowman and Zayn for Roadblock: End of the Line on December 18, being announced as a ten-minute time limit match in which Strowman had ten minutes to defeat Zayn, which Strowman was unable to do. The following night on Raw, Strowman demanded a match against Zayn, but Foley had given Zayn the night off which prompted Strowman to attack Sin Cara and Titus O'Neil during their match and later attacked Seth Rollins and Roman Reigns during their match against Chris Jericho and Kevin Owens. Strowman defeated Zayn in a Last Man Standing match on the January 2, 2017 episode of Raw to end their feud.

On January 27 at the Royal Rumble, Strowman interfered during Kevin Owens and Roman Reigns' title match, helping Owens retain the Universal Championship. Later that night, Strowman entered the Royal Rumble match at #7, eliminating Mojo Rawley, Big Cass, Kalisto, Mark Henry, Big Show, James Ellsworth and Tye Dillinger before being eliminated by Baron Corbin. On the January 30 episode of Raw, Strowman challenged for his first world championship when he took on Kevin Owens for the Universal Championship as he was granted the match by Foley after video proof of Owens promising Strowman a title match, which Strowman won by disqualification after Reigns interfered and attacked him. Strowman then continued to demand better competition, easily defeating four local competitors and then being granted a match with Reigns at Fastlane who also had attacked him in his match against Samoa Joe, causing Joe to win. At the event on March 5, Strowman lost to Reigns, marking his first loss by pinfall. At WrestleMania 33 on April 2, Strowman competed in the André the Giant Memorial Battle Royal, which was won by Mojo Rawley.

On the April 10 episode of Raw, Strowman continued his feud with Reigns, attacking him and kayfabe injuring his shoulder. Despite playing a villain, Strowman received a very positive fan response, partially due to the negative fan reaction of Reigns. At Payback on April 30, Strowman defeated Reigns. During a match against Big Show on the April 17 episode of Raw, Strowman performed a superplex on Big Show off the ropes, causing the ring to implode and collapse; the match subsequently ended in a no contest. After the May 8 episode of Raw, WWE claimed that Strowman had a legitimate injury with a shattered elbow and would therefore be sidelined for about six months. This also caused a change in the schedule, with the planned match between him and Brock Lesnar at Great Balls of Fire having to be scrapped. Strowman underwent surgery three days later on May 11. However, Dave Meltzer of the Wrestling Observer Newsletter reported that while Strowman's elbow injury was indeed legitimate, it was minor, scheduled to sideline him for only two months, with WWE exaggerating it in order for him to make a surprise return "four months early". On the June 19 episode of Raw, Strowman returned from injury, attacking Roman Reigns. This led to an ambulance match at Great Balls of Fire on July 9, which Strowman won. At SummerSlam on August 20, Strowman challenged for Lesnar's Universal Championship in a fatal-four-way match also involving Reigns and Samoa Joe in a losing effort. Strowman faced Lesnar for the championship at No Mercy on September 24, but was unsuccessful once again.

Strowman later became involved in The Miz's feud with the reformed stable The Shield, leading to a five-on-three handicap TLC match at TLC: Tables, Ladders & Chairs on October 22, where he, Miz, Cesaro and Sheamus, and Kane faced Dean Ambrose, Seth Rollins and Kurt Angle. During the match, Strowman's teammates turned on him by throwing him into the back of a garbage truck, turning Strowman face in the process. His team lost the match. Strowman returned to Raw the following week, attacking Miz and The Miztourage (Curtis Axel and Bo Dallas). At Survivor Series on November 19, Strowman was a part of Team Raw, defeating Team SmackDown as Strowman and Triple H were the sole survivors of the team. On the December 11 episode of Raw, Strowman fought Kane to a double countout in a match to determine the #1 contender to the Universal Championship on January 28, 2018 at the Royal Rumble, leading to the match being changed to a triple threat match involving also Kane and Lesnar. At the Royal Rumble, Strowman failed to win the title. The next night on Raw, Strowman defeated Kane in Last Man Standing match to qualify for the Elimination Chamber match at the titular pay-per-view to determine the #1 contender for the Universal Championship. At Elimination Chamber on February 25, Strowman eliminated The Miz, Elias, John Cena, Finn Bálor and Seth Rollins (setting the new record for the most eliminations in a single Elimination Chamber match), but was the last man eliminated by Roman Reigns.

World championship pursuits (2018–2019) 

On the March 12 episode of Raw, Strowman, despite lacking a partner, won a tag team battle royal to determine the #1 contenders for the Raw Tag Team Championship at WrestleMania 34. Raw general manager Kurt Angle allowed Strowman to challenge for the titles, under the provision he choose a partner at WrestleMania. At WrestleMania on April 8, Strowman chose a young fan in attendance named Nicholas to be his partner (in reality, son of referee John Cone). The duo defeated champions Cesaro and Sheamus, winning his first championship in WWE and making Nicholas the youngest champion of any kind in WWE history. The following night on Raw, Strowman and Nicholas relinquished the titles due to Nicholas' "scheduling conflict" (school). On April 27 at the Greatest Royal Rumble in Jeddah, Saudi Arabia, Strowman won the namesake match and in doing so broke the record for most eliminations in a Royal Rumble match with 13, beating Roman Reigns' previous record of 12. Strowman then entered into a feud with Kevin Owens. He and Bobby Lashley defeated Kevin Owens and Sami Zayn at Backlash on May 6, and won the Money in the Bank ladder match at the namesake pay-per-view on June 17. At Extreme Rules on July 15, Owens defeated Strowman in a steel cage match after Strowman performed a chokeslam off the cage through an announce table on Owens, giving Owens the win as his feet touched the floor first per the rules. At SummerSlam on August 19, Strowman defeated Owens with his Money in the Bank contract on the line in two minutes, ending their feud. Later that same night, Strowman announced he would be cashing in on the winner of the main event and challenging them after the match. However, then-reigning Universal Champion Brock Lesnar attacked Strowman during his match with Roman Reigns, leaving Strowman unable to cash in when Reigns won the title after pinning Lesnar.

Strowman attempted another cash-in on Reigns the next night on Raw, but was stopped by The Shield, who attacked Strowman before the match became official. Strowman formed an alliance with Dolph Ziggler and Drew McIntyre by helping them attack The Shield, turning heel. At Hell in a Cell on September 16, Strowman cashed in his Money in the Bank briefcase on Reigns, but due to interference from Brock Lesnar, the match ended in a no contest. At Super Show-Down on October 6, Strowman, Ziggler and McIntyre lost to The Shield, but defeated them two days later on Raw. On the October 15 episode of Raw, Strowman, Ziggler and McIntyre lost to The Shield again after McIntyre accidentally kicked Strowman during the match. Afterwards, Strowman powerslammed Ziggler before being attacked by McIntyre, dissolving their partnership and turning face again. At Crown Jewel on November 2, Strowman lost to Lesnar after a pre-match attack by Raw general manager Baron Corbin and five F-5s, in which Strowman kicked out of four F-5s. On November 18 at Survivor Series, Strowman was again attacked by Corbin, along with McIntyre and Bobby Lashley, after Team Raw defeated Team SmackDown in the traditional tag team elimination match. The following night on Raw, Strowman was again attacked by Corbin, Lashley and McIntyre, which was used to write him off television, as WWE revealed that Strowman was suffering an legit elbow injury, which would require surgery. Strowman returned at TLC on December 16, defeating Corbin in a Tables, Ladders, and Chairs match to earn a Universal Championship match against Brock Lesnar at the Royal Rumble and Corbin was stripped of all authoritative power. On the January 14, 2019 episode of Raw, he was removed from the Universal Championship match after damaging Vince McMahon's limo after chasing Baron Corbin, and refusing to pay for the damages. However, he instead participated in the Royal Rumble match on January 27, replacing John Cena, who wasn't medically cleared to compete. He was the last man eliminated by eventual winner Seth Rollins. Strowman continued his feud with Corbin, leading to a no-disqualification match at Elimination Chamber on February 17, which Strowman lost after interference from McIntyre and Lashley. The following night on Raw, Strowman defeated Corbin in a tables match, ending their feud.

Strowman was then involved in a storyline with Colin Jost and Michael Che of Saturday Night Live (SNL) fame. On the March 4 episode of Raw, the SNL duo appeared and were announced as special correspondents for WrestleMania 35; in a backstage segment later that night, Jost questioned the legitimacy of professional wrestling, resulting in Strowman attacking him. On the March 18 episode of Raw, Strowman announced his participation in the André the Giant Memorial Battle Royal. He challenged the duo to also enter the battle royal, which was made official by WrestleMania 35 host Alexa Bliss. The match, which took place on the kickoff show on April 7, saw Strowman emerge victorious after last eliminating Jost. Strowman broke another record, of most eliminations in that particular match as well with 14 eliminations overall. On the April 29 episode of Raw, Strowman was announced as one of the entrants in the Money in the Bank ladder match at the titular event on May 19. However, on the May 13 episode of Raw, Strowman lost to Sami Zayn, who had the help of Corbin and McIntrye, forfeiting his spot in the match to Zayn in the process. On the June 3 episode of Raw, Strowman defeated Bobby Lashley in an arm wrestling match, but was then attacked by Lashley, setting up a match at Super ShowDown on June 7 which Strowman also won. On the July 1 episode of Raw, Strowman faced Lashley in a Falls Count Anywhere match which ended in a no contest after Strowman crashed Lashley through the LED boards on the stage where Strowman suffered a kayfabe ruptured spleen. Strowman defeated Lashley in a Last Man Standing match at Extreme Rules on July 14 to end the feud.

Championship reigns (2019–2020) 

In August, Strowman entered into a storyline with Universal Champion Seth Rollins after saving Rollins from an attack by The O.C. (AJ Styles, Luke Gallows and Karl Anderson). Strowman and Rollins defeated Gallows and Anderson to win the Raw Tag Team Championship on the August 19 episode of Raw. A Universal Championship match between Strowman and Rollins was subsequently arranged for Clash of Champions, with the duo also having to defend the tag titles against Dolph Ziggler and Robert Roode at the event. At the event on September 15, Strowman and Rollins lost the tag titles to Ziggler and Roode in the opening match, and in the main event, Strowman lost to Rollins. Strowman then started an on-air feud with boxer Tyson Fury. This led to a brawl on October 7 episode of Raw, due to neither man wanting to offer an apology. Strowman lost to Fury at Crown Jewel on October 31 after he was counted out, and after the match, Strowman laid out Fury with a Running Powerslam to end their feud. 

As part of the 2019 draft, Strowman was drafted to the SmackDown brand. At Survivor Series on November 24, Strowman was a part of Team SmackDown in the 5-on-5-on-5 Survivor Series match between Team Raw, Team SmackDown and Team NXT, which Strowman's team won. At Royal Rumble on January 26, 2020, Strowman entered at #14 but was eliminated by Brock Lesnar and Keith Lee. On the January 31 episode of SmackDown, despite interferences from Sami Zayn and Cesaro, Strowman defeated Shinsuke Nakamura to win the Intercontinental Championship for the first time in his career, marking his first singles title in WWE. However, at Elimination Chamber on March 8, Strowman lost the title to Sami Zayn in a 3-on-1 handicap match also involving Nakamura and Cesaro; Zayn pinned Strowman.

In April, it was announced that Strowman would replace Roman Reigns at WrestleMania 36, facing Goldberg for the Universal Championship, after Reigns opted to pull out of the event amid concerns surrounding the COVID-19 pandemic that had already affected the pay-per-view. On the first night of WrestleMania on April 4, Strowman defeated Goldberg to win the Universal Championship, his first world championship. He then began a feud with Bray Wyatt, leading to a title match at Money in the Bank on May 10, which Strowman won. After retaining the title against John Morrison and The Miz at Backlash on June 14, Strowman rekindled his rivalry with Wyatt, who challenged him to a non-title "Wyatt Swamp Fight" on the June 26 episode of SmackDown, which Strowman accepted. At The Horror Show at Extreme Rules on July 19, Strowman lost after being dragged down into a lake by Wyatt, who used multiple illusions in the match. On the August 14 episode of SmackDown, Strowman, now sporting a shaved head, acted more sinister as he showed no compassion towards Alexa Bliss and physically attacked her with a gorilla press, turning heel for the first time since 2018. At SummerSlam on August 23, Strowman lost the Universal Championship to Wyatt in a Falls Count Anywhere match, ending his reign at 141 days, after which both he and Wyatt were attacked by a returning Roman Reigns. At Payback on August 30, Strowman failed to win back the title after he was pinned by Reigns.

Various feuds and initial departure (2020–2021) 
As part of the 2020 Draft in October, Strowman was drafted to the Raw brand. At Survivor Series on November 22, Strowman was a part of Team Raw, who defeated Team SmackDown in a clean sweep. The following night on Raw, Strowman was indefinitely suspended after headbutting WWE official Adam Pearce. At Royal Rumble on January 31, 2021, he entered at #30, eliminating Sheamus, Cesaro, and AJ Styles but was eliminated by eventual winner Edge. On the February 22 episode of Raw, he faced Bobby Lashley for an opportunity to be added to the WWE Championship match scheduled the following week, but lost. 

On the March 1 episode of Raw, Strowman and WWE official Adam Pearce faced Raw Tag Team Champions The Hurt Business, but lost after Shane McMahon got up the ring apron and forced Strowman to tag Pearce in, causing Benjamin to roll up Pearce and get the win for him and Alexander. The next week, Strowman demanded an apology from McMahon, who played a prank on Strowman by mocking him and pretending to flee the arena, before calling him "stupid" behind his back, turning face again. McMahon was scheduled to face Strowman at Fastlane on March 21, but McMahon suffered a left knee injury preparing for the match, instead having Elias take his place in the match; Strowman defeated Elias. On the first night of WrestleMania 37 on April 10, Strowman defeated McMahon in a steel cage match, ending their feud. 

On the Raw after WrestleMania, Strowman faced Drew McIntyre and Randy Orton in a triple threat match for a WWE Championship match at WrestleMania Backlash but failed to win after McIntyre pinned Orton. On the April 26 episode of Raw, Strowman defeated McIntyre to gain entry into the WWE Championship match following interference from Mace and T-Bar. On the May 10 episode of Raw, Strowman interfered in the main event match and assaulted both McIntyre and Lashley, sending the latter through the barricade with a powerslam. At WrestleMania Backlash on May 16, Strowman failed to win the title from Lashley in a triple threat match also involving McIntyre. This would turn out to be his final match for the company as he was released on June 2, 2021.

Control Your Narrative (2021–2022) 
Scherr made his independent debut at Free The Narrative 2: The Monsters In Us All, defeating the show's creator EC3. In January 2022, it was announced that Scherr would team with the former Erick Rowan (now Erick Redbeard) in a match against Bully Ray and nZo, which took place at Northeast Wrestling's WrestleFest XXVI on January 22, with Scherr and Redbeard winning the match. It marked the first time Scherr and Redbeard had teamed together in five years.

Scherr debuted at the ROH pay-per-view Final Battle on December 11, 2021, where he, EC3, and Westin Blake formed the new Control Your Narrative stable and attacked Eli Isom, Dak Draper and Brian Johnson. On February 17, 2022, Scherr along with fellow professional wrestler EC3, announced the formation of their own wrestling promotion, Control Your Narrative (CYN). The company started tapings for their impending television deal in March; taking inspiration from Fight Club, the promotion featured talent booking their own storylines in a way that resembles the early stages of Fight Clubs "Project: Mayhem".

Return to WWE (2022–present) 
On September 1, 2022, Scherr was reported to have re-signed with WWE. On the September 5 episode of Raw, Braun Strowman returned to WWE and attacked every single competitor in a fatal four way tag team match. It was then reported that he would move to the SmackDown brand as a face. Strowman then began a short feud with Alpha Academy (Chad Gable and Otis), defeating Otis on the September 23 episode of SmackDown, and Gable on the October 3 episode of Raw. On the October 14 episode of SmackDown, Strowman was confronted by Omos, starting a feud between the two. At Crown Jewel on November 5, Strowman defeated Omos.

Strowman then entered into the SmackDown World Cup with the winner earning an eventual Intercontinental Championship match against Gunther. He defeated Jinder Mahal in the first round before losing to Ricochet in the Semi-Final’s. 

Ricochet and Strowman then formed a shortly lived tag team to feud with Imperium, where Strowman and Ricochet emerged victorious against Ludwig Kaiser and Giovanni Vinci in a Miracle on 34th Street Fight on the Christmas Eve edition of SmackDown. 

This led to an Intercontinental Championship match against Gunther on the January 13 episode of SmackDown, where Strowman lost. On the following episode of SmackDown, Strowman declared his entry into the 2023 Royal Rumble Match. At the Royal Rumble on January 28, Strowman entered the match at #27 eliminating Omos before being eliminated by eventual winner Cody Rhodes.

Personal life 
Scherr supports the Green Bay Packers. He is the godfather of Knash Rotunda, Bray Wyatt and JoJo Offerman's son.

Other media 
Scherr, as Braun Strowman, is a playable character in the video games WWE 2K17, WWE 2K18, WWE 2K19, WWE 2K20, WWE 2K Battlegrounds and WWE 2K22.

Filmography

Film

Television

Championships and accomplishments

Professional wrestling 
 Pro Wrestling Illustrated
 Ranked No. 6 of the top 500 singles wrestlers in the PWI 500 in 2018
 Sports Illustrated
 Ranked No. 5 of the top 10 wrestlers in 2017
 Wrestling Observer Newsletter
 Most Improved (2017)
Worst Feud of the Year (2020) 
 Worst Match of the Year (2020) 
 WWE
WWE Universal Championship (1 time)
 WWE Intercontinental Championship (1 time)
 WWE Raw Tag Team Championship (2 times) – with Nicholas (1) and Seth Rollins (1)
 WWE SmackDown Tag Team Championship #1 Contender Tournament (2023) – with Ricochet
 WWE Greatest Royal Rumble
 Men's Money in the Bank (2018)
 André the Giant Memorial Battle Royal (2019)
WWE Year-End Award for Male Superstar of the Year (2018)

Strength athletics 
 Arnold Amateur Strongman Championships
 Winner (2012)
 Monster of the Midland
 Winner (2010)
 NAS US Amateur National Championships
 Winner (2011)
 Summerfest Strongman
 Winner (2011)
 West Cary Fall Festival of Power
 Winner (2011)

Notes

References

External links 

 
 
 
 

1983 births
21st-century professional wrestlers
American male professional wrestlers
American male weightlifters
American powerlifters
American strength athletes
Living people
People from Sherrills Ford, North Carolina
Professional wrestlers from North Carolina
WWF/WWE Intercontinental Champions
WWE Universal Champions